Kastelec is a settlement in the City Municipality of Koper in the Littoral region of Slovenia.

The local church is dedicated to the Exaltation of the Holy Cross and belongs to the Parish of Klanec.

References

External links

Kastelec on Geopedia
Kastelec on Google Maps (map, photographs, street view)

Populated places in the City Municipality of Koper